Roselidah Obunaga-Mangala (born 23 December 1973) is a Kenyan female volleyball player. She was part of the Kenya women's national volleyball team.

She competed with the national team at the 2000 Summer Olympics in Sydney, Australia and at the 2004 Summer Olympics in Athens, Greece. 
She played with Missouri State University in 2002 and 2003, and Columbia College.

She coaches at Stephens College.

Clubs
  Missouri State University, 2002–2003.

References

External links
 
 
 http://www.naia.org/ViewArticle.dbml?ATCLID=205293255

1973 births
Living people
Kenyan women's volleyball players
People from Kakamega
Volleyball players at the 2004 Summer Olympics
Olympic volleyball players of Kenya
Volleyball players at the 2000 Summer Olympics